Godward is a surname. Notable people with the surname include: 

Ernest Godward (1869–1936), English inventor and engineer
John William Godward (1861–1922), English painter
William Godward (born 1984), Australian sports shooter

See also
Goddard (surname)